Right Rev. Robert McKew   (16 February 1872 – 11 October 1944) was an Irish Anglican priest in the 20th century.

McKew was born on Valentia Island, County Kerry. He was educated at Trinity College, Dublin and ordained in 1902. He became a Royal Navy Chaplain from January 1903, and served on (amongst others) HMS Hyacinth, HMS Venerable, HMS Cornwall and HMS Collingwood. He became Chaplain of the Fleet in 1924 and held the post for five years. He was then Archdeacon of the Isle of Wight until his retirement in 1936. An Honorary Chaplain to the King, he died on the Isle of Wight in 1944.

He was appointed a Commander of the Order of the British Empire in the 1919 Birthday Honours.

References

Alumni of Trinity College Dublin
Commanders of the Order of the British Empire
Chaplains of the Fleet
Archdeacons of the Isle of Wight
1872 births
1944 deaths
World War I chaplains
Honorary Chaplains to the King